Berrabi Bakhti is a village in the commune of Taghit, in Taghit District, Béchar Province, Algeria.

References

Neighbouring towns and cities

Populated places in Béchar Province